Mich or MICH may refer to:

People
 An abbreviation for Michelle (name)
 Mich Dulce (born 1981), Filipina fashion designer, milliner, corsetiere, feminist activist, actress, artist and singer
 Mich Matsudaira (1937–2019), American businessman and civil rights activist
 Vigilio Mich (1931–2019), Italian cross-country skier who competed in the 1956 Olympics

Places
 Mich, Narmashir, Iran, a village
 Mich., an abbreviation for the U.S. state of Michigan

Other uses
 Modular Integrated Communications Helmet (MICH), an American combat helmet

See also

 
 Mich Mich (disambiguation)
 Mitch (disambiguation)
 Mitchell (disambiguation)
 Michelle (disambiguation)
 Michigan (disambiguation)
 Mish (disambiguation)